Anthracus glabrus is an insect-eating ground beetle of the genus Anthracus. It is found in Indonesia.

References

glabrus
Beetles described in 1952